Róbert Erban (born 9 July 1972 in Piešťany) is a Czechoslovak-Slovak sprint canoer who competed from the early 1990s to the mid-2000s (decade). He won four medals at the ICF Canoe Sprint World Championships with a gold (K-4 500 m: 2006 for Slovakia), two silvers (K-4 500 m and K-4 1000 m: both 2005 for Slovakia), and a bronze (K-2 10000 m: 1991 for Czechoslovakia).

Erban also competed in four Summer Olympics, earning his best finish of fourth twice in the K-4 1000 m event (1992 for Czechoslovakia, 2000 for Slovakia).

A member of the ŠKP club in Bratislava, he is 188 cm (6'2") tall and weighs 85 kg (187 lbs).

References

Sports-reference.com profile

External links 
 
 
 
 

1972 births
Canoeists at the 1992 Summer Olympics
Canoeists at the 1996 Summer Olympics
Canoeists at the 2000 Summer Olympics
Canoeists at the 2004 Summer Olympics
Czechoslovak male canoeists
Living people
Olympic canoeists of Czechoslovakia
Olympic canoeists of Slovakia
Slovak male canoeists
Sportspeople from Piešťany
ICF Canoe Sprint World Championships medalists in kayak